Amphilius cryptobullatus is a species of catfish in the genus Amphilius. It is endemic to the Luongo River in the upper Congo system in Zambia. Its length reaches 13.5 cm.

References 

cryptobullatus
Freshwater fish of Africa
Fish described in 1986